Alanson Mellen Kimball (March 12, 1827May 26, 1913) was an American politician who served as a member of the United States House of Representatives from Wisconsin's 6th congressional district.  He also served one term in the Wisconsin Senate, representing Adams, Juneau, and Waushara counties.

Biography
Born in Buxton, Maine, Kimball moved to Wisconsin in 1852 and engaged in agricultural and mercantile pursuits, later serving in the Wisconsin State Senate in 1863 and 1864. He was elected as a member of the Republican Party to the United States House of Representatives in 1874 as part of the 44th Congress representing Wisconsin's 6th congressional district. Following his defeat for re-election in 1876, he became involved in the lumber business and served as a delegate to the 1884 Republican National Convention in Chicago.

Death and legacy
Kimball died in Pine River, Waushara County, Wisconsin, on May 26, 1913. He is interred at Pine River Cemetery. He was preceded in death by his wife, Frances, and his first son, Charlie.

The town of Kimball, Wisconsin, in Iron County, is named in his honor.

References

External links

1827 births
1913 deaths
People from Buxton, Maine
People from Waushara County, Wisconsin
Businesspeople from Wisconsin
Republican Party Wisconsin state senators
Republican Party members of the United States House of Representatives from Wisconsin
19th-century American politicians
19th-century American businesspeople